Nalini Sriram is an Indian fashion costume designer and entrepreneur. She is considered one of the early pioneers of fashion designing for South Indian films.

Career 
Nalini graduated with a degree in English literature and worked as a freelance writer during her early career. After marrying film producer S. Sriram, she opted to pursue a career in fashion designing and made her debut with Mani Ratnam's Roja (1992). She continued to work for Mani Ratnam's productions, and the success of her work in Bombay (1995) attracted offers from other studios. In 2000, a particular paavadai dhavani she had made for Aishwarya Rai in Kandukondain Kandukondain (2000) triggered demand for similar products in Chennai.

Nalini has regularly collaborated in films directed by Gautham Vasudev Menon since Kaakha Kaakha (2003). Notably, she won acclaim for her work in Vinnaithaandi Varuvaayaa (2010).

She has also worked in the Telugu film industry, notably designing the costumes for the cast in Gautham Menon's Ye Maaya Chesave (2010) and Vikram Kumar's Manam (2014).

Away from the film industry, Nalini co-owns the Shilpi boutique, an independent brand. She also conducts workshops and curates new collections.

Personal life
Nalini was married to film producer S. Sriram, who had headed Aalayam Productions. He died of cardiac arrest in September 2019.

Filmography

 1992 Roja
 1993 Thiruda Thiruda 
 1995 Aasai
 1995 Bombay
 2000 Kandukondain Kandukondain
 2002 Gemini 
 2003 Kaakha Kaakha 
 2004 Ghilli 
 2004 Perazhagan
 2005 Maayavi
 2005 Ghajini
 2006 Thirupathi
 2006 Sillunu Oru Kaadhal
 2006 Vettaiyaadu Vilaiyaadu
 2007 Pokkiri
 2007 Pachaikili Muthucharam
 2007 Azhagiya Thamizh Magan 
 2008 Kuruvi
 2008 Kuselan
 2008 Satyam
 2008 Vaaranam Aayiram 
 2009 Villu
 2009 Ayan
 2009 Vettaikaaran
 2010 Asal
 2010 Vinnaithaandi Varuvaayaa 
 2010 Ye Maaya Chesave 
 2010 Sura
 2011 Kaavalan 
 2011 Velayudham 
 2011 Ko 
 2011 Engeyum Kaadhal
 2011 Nadunisi Naaygal 
 2012 Ekk Deewana Tha
 2012 Neethaane En Ponvasantham 
 2012 Yeto Vellipoyindhi Manasu 
 2014 Manam 
 2016 Remo
 2017 Hello

References 

Living people
Indian fashion designers
Indian costume designers
Artists from Tamil Nadu
Year of birth missing (living people)
Indian women fashion designers
Fashion stylists